Edward H. Mayer  (August 16, 1865 – May 15, 1946), was an American third baseman in Major League Baseball for the Philadelphia Phillies.

Biography
Mayer was born in Marshall, Illinois, and played for the Philadelphia Phillies from 1890 to 1891. He died in Chicago, Illinois in 1946, and is interred in Mount Carmel Cemetery in Chicago.

References

External links

1865 births
1946 deaths
Major League Baseball third basemen
Baseball players from Illinois
19th-century baseball players
Philadelphia Phillies players
Eau Claire Lumbermen players
Danville Browns players
Omaha Omahogs players
Omaha Lambs players
Davenport Onion Weeders players
Burlington Babies players
Kansas City Cowboys (minor league) players